The Syracuse, Lakeside and Baldwinsville Railway began operations in 1898 and provided service along the shore of Onondaga Lake outside of Syracuse, New York. Due to dependence on summer traffic, the company did not prosper during the remainder of the first year; however, during 1899, the rail was extended to Baldwinsville, a suburb, and the line began to handle daily commuter traffic.

References

Defunct railroads in Syracuse, New York
Defunct New York (state) railroads
Railway companies established in 1898
Railway companies disestablished in 1905
Interurban railways in New York (state)
Onondaga Lake